In physics and astronomy, an N-body simulation is a simulation of a dynamical system of particles, usually under the influence of physical forces, such as gravity (see n-body problem for other applications). N-body simulations are widely used tools in astrophysics, from investigating the dynamics of few-body systems like the Earth-Moon-Sun system to understanding the evolution of the large-scale structure of the universe. In physical cosmology, N-body simulations are used to study processes of non-linear structure formation such as galaxy filaments and galaxy halos from the influence of dark matter. Direct N-body simulations are used to study the dynamical evolution of star clusters.

Nature of the particles

The 'particles' treated by the simulation may or may not correspond to physical objects which are particulate in nature. For example, an N-body simulation of a star cluster might have a particle per star, so each particle has some physical significance. On the other hand, a simulation of a gas cloud cannot afford to have a particle for each atom or molecule of gas as this would require on the order of  particles for each mole of material (see Avogadro constant), so a single 'particle' would represent some much larger quantity of gas (often implemented using Smoothed Particle Hydrodynamics). This quantity need not have any physical significance, but must be chosen as a compromise between accuracy and manageable computer requirements.

Direct gravitational N-body simulations

In direct gravitational N-body simulations, the equations of motion of a system of  N particles under the influence of their mutual gravitational forces are integrated numerically without any simplifying approximations. These calculations are used in situations where interactions between individual objects, such as stars or planets, are important to the evolution of the system.

The first direct gravitational N-body simulations were carried out by Erik Holmberg at the Lund Observatory in 1941, determining the forces between stars in encountering galaxies via the mathematical equivalence between light propagation and gravitational interaction: putting light bulbs at the positions of the stars and measuring the directional light fluxes at the positions of the stars by a photo cell, the equations of motion can be integrated with  effort. The first purely calculational simulations were then done by Sebastian von Hoerner at the Astronomisches Rechen-Institut in Heidelberg, Germany. Sverre Aarseth at the University of Cambridge (UK) has dedicated his entire scientific life to the development of a series of highly efficient N-body codes for astrophysical applications which use adaptive (hierarchical) time steps, an Ahmad-Cohen neighbour scheme and regularization of close encounters. Regularization is a mathematical trick to remove the singularity in the Newtonian law of gravitation for two particles which approach each other arbitrarily close. Sverre Aarseth's codes are used to study the dynamics of star clusters, planetary systems and galactic nuclei.

General relativity simulations

Many simulations are large enough that the effects of general relativity in establishing a Friedmann-Lemaitre-Robertson-Walker cosmology are significant. This is incorporated in the simulation as an evolving measure of distance (or scale factor) in a comoving coordinate system, which causes the particles to slow in comoving coordinates (as well as due to the redshifting of their physical energy). However, the contributions of general relativity and the finite speed of gravity can otherwise be ignored, as typical dynamical timescales are long compared to the light crossing time for the simulation, and the space-time curvature induced by the particles and the particle velocities are small. The boundary conditions of these cosmological simulations are usually periodic (or toroidal), so that one edge of the simulation volume matches up with the opposite edge.

Calculation optimizations

N-body simulations are simple in principle, because they involve merely integrating the 6N ordinary differential equations defining the particle motions in Newtonian gravity. In practice, the number N of particles involved is usually very large (typical simulations include many millions, the Millennium simulation included ten billion) and the number of particle-particle interactions needing to be computed increases on the order of N2, and so direct integration of the differential equations can be prohibitively computationally expensive. Therefore, a number of refinements are commonly used.

Numerical integration is usually performed over small timesteps using a method such as leapfrog integration. However all numerical integration leads to errors. Smaller steps give lower errors but run more slowly. Leapfrog integration is roughly 2nd order on the timestep, other integrators such as Runge–Kutta methods can have 4th order accuracy or much higher.

One of the simplest refinements is that each particle carries with it its own timestep variable, so that particles with widely different dynamical times don't all have to be evolved forward at the rate of that with the shortest time.

There are two basic approximation schemes to decrease the computational time for such simulations. These can reduce the computational complexity to O(N log N) or better, at the loss of accuracy.

Tree methods

In tree methods, such as a Barnes–Hut simulation, an octree is usually used to divide the volume into cubic cells and only interactions between particles from nearby cells need to be treated individually; particles in distant cells can be treated collectively as a single large particle centered at the distant cell's center of mass (or as a low-order multipole expansion). This can dramatically reduce the number of particle pair interactions that must be computed. To prevent the simulation from becoming swamped by computing particle-particle interactions, the cells must be refined to smaller cells in denser parts of the simulation which contain many particles per cell. For simulations where particles are not evenly distributed, the well-separated pair decomposition methods of Callahan and Kosaraju yield optimal O(n log n) time per iteration with fixed dimension.

Particle mesh method

Another possibility is the particle mesh method in which space is discretised on a mesh and, for the purposes of computing the gravitational potential, particles are assumed to be divided between the surrounding 2x2 vertices of the mesh. Finding the potential energy Φ is easy, because the Poisson equation

where  is the comoving wavenumber and the hats denote Fourier transforms. Since this method is limited by the mesh size, in practice a smaller mesh or some other technique (such as combining with a tree or simple particle-particle algorithm) is used to compute the small-scale forces. Sometimes an adaptive mesh is used, in which the mesh cells are much smaller in the denser regions of the simulation.

Special-case optimizations 

Several different gravitational perturbation algorithms are used to get fairly accurate estimates of the path of objects in the solar system.

People often decide to put a satellite in a frozen orbit.
The path of a satellite closely orbiting the Earth can be accurately modeled starting from the 2-body elliptical orbit around the center of the Earth, and adding small corrections due to the oblateness of the Earth, gravitational attraction of the Sun and Moon, atmospheric drag, etc.
It is possible to find a frozen orbit without calculating the actual path of the satellite.

The path of a small planet, comet, or long-range spacecraft can often be accurately modeled starting from the 2-body elliptical orbit around the sun, and adding small corrections from the gravitational attraction of the larger planets in their known orbits.

Some characteristics of the long-term paths of a system of particles can be calculated directly. The actual path of any particular particle does not need to be calculated as an intermediate step. Such characteristics include Lyapunov stability, Lyapunov time, various measurements from ergodic theory, etc.

Two-particle systems
Although there are millions or billions of particles in typical simulations, they typically correspond to a real particle with a very large mass, typically 109 solar masses. This can introduce problems with short-range interactions between the particles such as the formation of two-particle binary systems. As the particles are meant to represent large numbers of dark matter particles or groups of stars, these binaries are unphysical. To prevent this, a softened Newtonian force law is used, which does not diverge as the inverse-square radius at short distances. Most simulations implement this quite naturally by running the simulations on cells of finite size. It is important to implement the discretization procedure in such a way that particles always exert a vanishing force on themselves.

Softening
Softening is a numerical trick used in N-body techniques to prevent numerical divergences when a particle comes too close to another (and the force goes to infinity). This is obtained by modifying the regularized gravitational potential of each particle as

(rather than 1/r) where  is the softening parameter. The value of the softening parameter should be set small enough to keep simulations realistic.

Incorporating baryons, leptons and photons into simulations

Many simulations simulate only cold dark matter, and thus include only the gravitational force. Incorporating baryons, leptons and photons into the simulations dramatically increases their complexity and often radical simplifications of the underlying physics must be made. However, this is an extremely important area and many modern simulations are now trying to understand processes that occur during galaxy formation which could account for galaxy bias.

Computational complexity 

Reif and Tate prove that if the n-body reachability problem is defined as follows – given n bodies satisfying a fixed electrostatic potential law, determining if a body reaches a destination ball in a given time bound where we require a poly(n) bits of accuracy and the target time is poly(n) is in PSPACE.

On the other hand, if the question is whether the body eventually reaches the destination ball, the problem is PSPACE-hard. These bounds are based on similar complexity bounds obtained for ray tracing.

Example Simulations

Common Boilerplate Code 
The simplest implementation of N-body simulations where  is a naive propagation of orbiting bodies; naive implying that the only forces acting on the orbiting bodies is the gravitational force which they exert on each other. In object-oriented programming languages, such as C++, some boilerplate code is useful for establishing the fundamental mathematical structures as well as data containers required for propagation; namely state vectors, and thus vectors, and some fundamental object containing this data, as well as the mass of an orbiting body. This method is applicable to other types of N-body simulations as well; a simulation of point masses with charges would use a similar method, however the force would be due to attraction or repulsion by interaction of electric fields. Regardless, acceleration of particle is a result of summed force vectors, divided by the mass of the particle:

An example of a programmatically stable and scalable method for containing kinematic data for a particle is the use of fixed length arrays, which in optimised code allows for easy memory allocation and prediction of consumed resources; as seen in the following C++ code:struct Vector3
{
    double e[3] = { 0 };

    Vector3() {}
    ~Vector3() {}

    inline Vector3(double e0, double e1, double e2)
    {
        this->e[0] = e0;
        this->e[1] = e1;
        this->e[2] = e2;
    }
};

struct OrbitalEntity
{
    double e[7] = { 0 };

    OrbitalEntity() {}
    ~OrbitalEntity() {}

    inline OrbitalEntity(double e0, double e1, double e2, double e3, double e4, double e5, double e6)
    {
        this->e[0] = e0;
        this->e[1] = e1;
        this->e[2] = e2;
        this->e[3] = e3;
        this->e[4] = e4;
        this->e[5] = e5;
        this->e[6] = e6;
    }
};Note that  contains enough room for a state vector, where:

,  the projection of the objects position vector in Cartesian space along 

,  the projection of the objects position vector in Cartesian space along 

,  the projection of the objects position vector in Cartesian space along 

,  the projection of the objects velocity vector in Cartesian space along 

,  the projection of the objects velocity vector in Cartesian space along 

,  the projection of the objects velocity vector in Cartesian space along 

Additionally,  contains enough room for a mass value.

Initialisation of Simulation Parameters 
Commonly, N-body simulations will be systems based of some type of equations of motion; of these, most will be dependent on some initial configuration to "seed" the simulation. In systems such as those dependent on some gravitational or electric potential, the force on a simulation entity is independent on its velocity. Hence, to seed the forces of the simulation, merely initial positions are needed, but this will not allow propagation- initial velocities are required. Consider a planet orbiting a star- it has no motion, but is subject to gravitational attraction to its host star. As a time progresses, and time steps are added, it will gather velocity according to its acceleration. For a given instant in time, the resultant acceleration of a body due to its neighbouring masses is independent of its velocity, however, for the time step , the resulting change in position is significantly different due the propagation's inherent dependency on velocity.

Without acceleration, is static, however, from the perspective of an observer seeing only position, it will take two time steps to see a change in velocity.

A solar-system-like simulation can be accomplished by taking average distances of planet equivalent point masses from a central star. To keep code simple, a non-rigorous approach based on semi-major axes and mean velocities will is used. Memory space for these bodies must be reserved before the bodies are configured; to allow for scalability, a malloc command may be used:OrbitalEntity* orbital_entities;

orbital_entities = (OrbitalEntity*)malloc(sizeof(OrbitalEntity) * (9 + N_ASTEROIDS));

orbital_entities[0] = { 0.0,0.0,0.0,        0.0,0.0,0.0,        1.989e30 }; // a star similar to the sun
orbital_entities[1] = { 57.909e9,0.0,0.0,   0.0,47.36e3,0.0,    0.33011e24 }; // a planet similar to mercury
orbital_entities[2] = { 108.209e9,0.0,0.0,  0.0,35.02e3,0.0,    4.8675e24 }; // a planet similar to venus
orbital_entities[3] = { 149.596e9,0.0,0.0,  0.0,29.78e3,0.0,    5.9724e24 }; // a planet similar to earth
orbital_entities[4] = { 227.923e9,0.0,0.0,  0.0,24.07e3,0.0,    0.64171e24 }; // a planet similar to mars
orbital_entities[5] = { 778.570e9,0.0,0.0,  0.0,13e3,0.0,       1898.19e24 }; // a planet similar to jupiter
orbital_entities[6] = { 1433.529e9,0.0,0.0, 0.0,9.68e3,0.0,     568.34e24 }; // a planet similar to saturn
orbital_entities[7] = { 2872.463e9,0.0,0.0, 0.0,6.80e3,0.0,     86.813e24 }; // a planet similar to uranus
orbital_entities[8] = { 4495.060e9,0.0,0.0, 0.0,5.43e3,0.0,     102.413e24 }; // a planet similar to neptunewhere  is a variable which will remain at 0 temporarily, but allows for future inclusion of significant numbers of asteroids, at the users discretion.
double t = t_0;
double dt = 86400;
double t_end = 86400 * 365 * 10; // approximately a decade in seconds

The extent of a simulation would logically be for the period where .

Propagation 
An entire simulation can consist of hundreds, thousands, millions, billions, or sometimes trillions of time steps. At the elementary level, each time step (for simulations with particles moving due to forces exerted on them) involves

 calculating the forces on each body
 calculating the accelerations of each body
 calculating the velocities of each body
 calculating the new position of each body
The above can be implemented quite simply with a while loop which continues while  exists in the aforementioned range:while (t < t_end)
{
    for (size_t m1_idx = 0; m1_idx < 9 + N_ASTEROIDS; m1_idx++)
    {       
        Vector3 a_g = { 0,0,0 };

        for (size_t m2_idx = 0; m2_idx < 9 + N_ASTEROIDS; m2_idx++)
        {
            if (m2_idx != m1_idx)
            {
                Vector3 r_vector;

                r_vector.e[0] = orbital_entities[m1_idx].e[0] - orbital_entities[m2_idx].e[0];
                r_vector.e[1] = orbital_entities[m1_idx].e[1] - orbital_entities[m2_idx].e[1];
                r_vector.e[2] = orbital_entities[m1_idx].e[2] - orbital_entities[m2_idx].e[2];

                double r_mag = sqrt(r_vector.e[0] * r_vector.e[0] + r_vector.e[1] * r_vector.e[1] + r_vector.e[2] * r_vector.e[2]);

                double acceleration = -1.0 * BIG_G * (orbital_entities[m2_idx].e[6]) / pow(r_mag, 2.0);

                Vector3 r_unit_vector = { r_vector.e[0] / r_mag,r_vector.e[1] / r_mag,r_vector.e[2] / r_mag };

                a_g.e[0] += acceleration * r_unit_vector.e[0];
                a_g.e[1] += acceleration * r_unit_vector.e[1];
                a_g.e[2] += acceleration * r_unit_vector.e[2];
            }
        }

        orbital_entities[m1_idx].e[3] += a_g.e[0] * dt;
        orbital_entities[m1_idx].e[4] += a_g.e[1] * dt;
        orbital_entities[m1_idx].e[5] += a_g.e[2] * dt;
    }

    for (size_t entity_idx = 0; entity_idx < 9 + N_ASTEROIDS; entity_idx++)
    {
        orbital_entities[entity_idx].e[0] += orbital_entities[entity_idx].e[3] * dt;
        orbital_entities[entity_idx].e[1] += orbital_entities[entity_idx].e[4] * dt;
        orbital_entities[entity_idx].e[2] += orbital_entities[entity_idx].e[5] * dt;
    }
    
    t += dt;
}Focusing on the inner four rocky planets in the simulation, the trajectories resulting from the above propagation is shown below:

See also

Millennium Run
Large-scale structure of the cosmos
GADGET
Galaxy formation and evolution
Natural units
Virgo Consortium
Barnes–Hut simulation
Bolshoi Cosmological Simulation

References

Further reading
 
 
 
 
 
.

Physical cosmology
Gravity
Simulation
Cosmological simulation
Articles containing video clips
Computational physics